Sir Donald Gainer  (18 October 1891 – 30 July 1966) was a British diplomat who was successively Ambassador to Venezuela, Brazil and Poland.

Career
Donald St Clair Gainer was educated at Charterhouse and then in Germany and France. He joined the British Consular Service in 1915 and was vice-consul successively in several towns in Norway (Narvik, Vardø, Christianssand, Tromsø, Bergen), then in Havana where he was chargé d'affaires between ambassadors. After serving at Rotterdam and Munich he was sent in 1929 to set up a new consular post at Breslau (now Wrocław, western Poland). He was Consul-General in Mexico 1931–32, then at Munich 1932–38 and Vienna 1938–39. The German government (which annexed Austria in 1938) expelled Gainer in 1939 in a tit-for-tat reprisal for the expulsion of the German consul at Liverpool.

Gainer was appointed Minister to Venezuela in 1939 and promoted to Ambassador in 1944. A few weeks later he was appointed ambassador to Brazil. He left Brazil in 1947 to a complimentary column from The Times correspondent in Rio de Janeiro and transferred to be ambassador to Poland. His final post was Permanent Under-Secretary (PUS) in charge of the German section at the Foreign Office 1950–51 (normally the PUS is the civil servant in charge of the Foreign Office, but at this time the German section was so important that its head had PUS rank).

Gainer retired from the Foreign Office in 1951 and was chief executive of the International Road Federation 1951–57. He was chairman of the Anglo-Brazilian Society 1955–64.
Sir D.St.Clair Gainer is finely drawn by Patrick-Leigh Fermor as the British consul in Munich who bailed him out with a new passport - to replace the one which was stolen - and a five-pound note, returned a year later by Leigh-Fermor from Constantinople.

Honours
Gainer was appointed OBE in 1934 and CMG in 1937. He was knighted KCMG in 1944 on his appointment to Brazil and given the additional, senior knighthood of GBE in the New Year Honours of 1950.

References
GAINER, Sir Donald St Clair, Who Was Who, A & C Black, 1920–2015 (online edition, Oxford University Press, 2014)
Sir Donald Gainer – Envoy In Brazil and Poland, The Times, London, 1 August 1966, page 12

External links

1891 births
1966 deaths
People educated at Charterhouse School
British expatriates in Norway
Ambassadors of the United Kingdom to Venezuela
Ambassadors of the United Kingdom to Brazil
Ambassadors of the United Kingdom to Poland
Knights Grand Cross of the Order of the British Empire
Knights Commander of the Order of St Michael and St George